The 2017 Amstel Gold Race was a road cycling one-day race that took place on 16 April. It was the 52nd edition of the Amstel Gold Race and the sixteenth event of the 2017 UCI World Tour.

It was won for the fourth time by Philippe Gilbert, defeating 's Michał Kwiatkowski in a two-up sprint finish. Michael Albasini from  completed the podium, leading home a small group ten seconds in arrears of the lead duo. Gilbert's win, coupled with a win two weeks prior at the Tour of Flanders, made him the third rider to win both races in the same year – after Eddy Merckx and Jan Raas.

After a 14-year hiatus, there was also a women's version of the Amstel Gold Race of 121 km, following the same parcours. This race was won by Anna van der Breggen.

Teams
As the Amstel Gold Race was a UCI World Tour event, all eighteen UCI WorldTeams were invited automatically and obliged to enter a team in the race. Six UCI Professional Continental teams competed, completing the 24-team peloton.

Result

References

External links
 

2017 UCI World Tour
2017 in Dutch sport
Amstel Gold Race
April 2017 sports events in Europe